The 2013 ICC Africa Under-19 Championship Division One was a cricket tournament held in Uganda from 25–31 May 2013. Matches were played at grounds in Entebbe and Kampala, with Kampala's Lugogo Stadium hosting the final.

Namibia won the tournament by defeating Kenya in the final, qualifying for the 2014 Under-19 World Cup in the United Arab Emirates. Two African under-19 sides, South Africa and Zimbabwe, are ICC full members, and thus qualified directly for the World Cup. Ugandan all-rounder Lawrence Sempijja was Player of the Tournament, while Namibian Xander Pitchers and Kenyan Paramveer Singh led the competition in runs and wickets, respectively. Namibia's JJ Smit was named Player of the Final, having taken 4/17 (including a hat-trick).

The tournament was the fifth edition of the ICC Africa Under-19 Championships, and the second to be held in Uganda (after the inaugural championship in 2001). Eight teams participated, divided into two pools for the group stages. The five best teams after the tournament's playoffs qualified directly for the 2015 Division One tournament, while the three lowest-placed teams were relegated to the 2014 Division Two tournament, with the winner of that tournament gaining promotion to Division One in 2015.

Teams and qualification 
The top seven teams at the eight-team 2010 Division One tournament qualified directly for the 2013 Division One Tournament. The last-placed team, Tanzania, was relegated to the 2013 Division Two tournament, played in Benoni, South Africa, in March 2013. The Division Two tournament was won by Ghana, but that side was unable to attend the Division One tournament, with runner-up Tanzania taking their place.

Preparation

Group stage

Pool A

Pool B

Finals

7th-place playoff

5th-place playoff

3rd-place playoff

Final

Statistics

Most runs
The top five runscorers are included in this table, ranked by runs scored and then by batting average.

Source: CricketArchive

Most wickets

The top five wicket takers are listed in this table, ranked by wickets taken and then by bowling average.

Source: CricketArchive

References 

Under-19 regional cricket tournaments
Sport in Kampala
International cricket competitions in 2013
2013 in Ugandan cricket
International cricket competitions in Uganda